The Men's sabre event of the 2013 World Fencing Championships was held on August 7, 2013. The qualification was held on August 5, 2013.

Medalists

Draw

Finals
All times are (UTC+2)

Top half

Blue piste

Yellow piste

Bottom half

Green piste

Red piste

Final classification

References

 Official site 
 Bracket from Round of 64 to Round of 16 
 Bracket from Quarterfinals 
 Final classification 

2013 World Fencing Championships